The 1959 Baltimore mayoral election saw the election of J. Harold Grady. Grady unseated incumbent mayor Thomas D'Alesandro Jr. in the Democratic primary, and went on to defeat former mayor and governor Theodore McKeldin in the general election.

Nominations
Primary elections were held March 3.

Democratic primary
Incumbent mayor Thomas D'Alesandro was defeated in the primary.

Republican primary

General election
The general election was held May 5.

References

Baltimore mayoral
Mayoral elections in Baltimore
Baltimore